Lana (October 7, 1970 - November, 2016) was a female chimpanzee, the first to be used in language research using lexigrams. She was born at the Yerkes National Primate Research Center of Emory University, and the project she was allocated to when 1 year old, the LANguage Analogue project led by Duane Rumbaugh, was named after her with the acronym LANA because the project team felt that her identity was well worth preserving.

LANA project
The researchers stated Lana showed that she could discriminate between lexigrams, sequence words grammatically and make novel utterances, demonstrating language learning.

The first LANA project (1971) officially had two Principal Investigators, Rumbaugh and Ernst von Glasersfeld (cf. NIH grants HD-06016 and RR-00165). Ernst von Glasersfeld developed the language that Lana learned to use: he coined the term "lexigram", created the first 120 of them and designed the grammar that regulated their combination. This artificial language was called Yerkish, in honor of Robert M. Yerkes, the founder of the laboratory within which the LANA project was conceived and conducted.

The early project also had several graduate-student researchers. The prime researcher, and the prime worker with Lana was Dr. Timothy V. Gill. Included in the project were graduate students Gwen Bell Dooley, Beverly Wilkenson, and Michael D. Haberman, among others.  Gwen Bell Dooley demonstrated Lana's cognitive capability to distinguish between two numerical sets of objects which she then labelled with either "more" or "less", whichever was requested.

See also
 Great ape language
 Koko
 Kanzi
 Washoe
 Nim Chimpsky
 List of individual apes
 Alex (parrot)
 Akeakamai
 Evolution of language
 Panbanisha

References

 Rumbaugh, D. M. ed. (1977). Language Learning by a Chimpanzee: The Lana Project. New York, Academic Press.

External links
 Duane Rumbaugh page at Great Ape Trust website.
 Ernst von Glasersfeld page by Alexander Riegler.

Apes from language studies
Individual chimpanzees
1970 animal births